In algebra, the nilradical of a  commutative ring is the ideal consisting of the nilpotent elements:

It is thus the radical of the zero ideal. If the nilradical is the zero ideal, the ring is called a reduced ring. The nilradical of a commutative ring is the intersection of all prime ideals.

In the non-commutative ring case the same definition does not always work. This has resulted in several radicals generalizing the commutative case in distinct ways; see the article Radical of a ring for more on this.

The nilradical of a Lie algebra is similarly defined for Lie algebras.

Commutative rings 

The nilradical of a commutative ring is the set of all nilpotent elements in the ring, or equivalently the radical of the zero ideal. This is an ideal because the sum of any two nilpotent elements is nilpotent (by the binomial formula), and the product of any element with a nilpotent element is nilpotent (by commutativity). It can also be characterized as the intersection of all the prime ideals of the ring (in fact, it is the intersection of all minimal prime ideals).

A ring is called reduced if it has no nonzero nilpotent. Thus, a ring is reduced if and only if its nilradical is zero.

Since every maximal ideal is a prime ideal, the Jacobson radical — which is the intersection of maximal ideals — must contain the nilradical. A ring R is called a Jacobson ring if the nilradical and Jacobson radical of R/P coincide for all prime ideals P of R. An Artinian ring is Jacobson, and its nilradical is the maximal nilpotent ideal of the ring. In general, if the nilradical is finitely generated (e.g., the ring is Noetherian), then it is nilpotent.

Noncommutative rings 

For noncommutative rings, there are several analogues of the nilradical.  The lower nilradical (or Baer–McCoy radical, or prime radical) is the analogue of the radical of the zero ideal and is defined as the intersection of the prime ideals of the ring.  The analogue of the set of all nilpotent elements is the upper nilradical and is defined as the ideal generated by all nil ideals of the ring, which is itself a nil ideal.  The set of all nilpotent elements itself need not be an ideal (or even a subgroup), so the upper nilradical can be much smaller than this set.  The Levitzki radical is in between and is defined as the largest locally nilpotent ideal.  As in the commutative case, when the ring is Artinian, the Levitzki radical is nilpotent and so is the unique largest nilpotent ideal.  Indeed, if the ring is merely Noetherian, then the lower, upper, and Levitzki radical are nilpotent and coincide, allowing the nilradical of any Noetherian ring to be defined as the unique largest (left, right, or two-sided) nilpotent ideal of the ring.

References

 Eisenbud, David, "Commutative Algebra with a View Toward Algebraic Geometry", Graduate Texts in Mathematics, 150, Springer-Verlag, 1995, .
 

Commutative algebra
Ideals (ring theory)

Notes